Blown plate is a hand-blown glass. There is a record of blown plate being produced in London in 1620.

Production
Blown plate was made by hand-grinding broad sheet glass. As the process was labour-intensive, and expensive, blown plate was mainly used for carriages and mirrors rather than in windows for buildings.
Other methods for making hand-blown glass included: broad sheet, crown glass, polished plate and cylinder blown sheet. These methods of manufacture lasted at least until the end of the 19th century.  The early 20th century marked the move away from hand-blown to machine manufactured glass such as rolled plate, machine drawn cylinder sheet,  flat drawn sheet, single and twin ground polished plate and float glass.

References

Glass production
Glass types